Castell'Umberto (Sicilian: Castedd'Umbertu) is a comune (municipality) in the Metropolitan City of Messina in the Italian region Sicily, located about  east of Palermo and about  west of Messina.

Castell'Umberto borders the following municipalities: Naso, San Salvatore di Fitalia, Sinagra, Tortorici, Ucria. The local economy is based on the extraction and working of stone

People
 Nick Catania (born 1945)

References

External links
 Official website

Cities and towns in Sicily